Egon Kramminger (born 5 August 1948) is an Austrian para table tennis player. He is a four-time World medalist, 12-time European medalist and has participated at the Paralympic Games five times.

Accident
On 9 September 1967, Kramminger crashed his car into a high voltage mast while driving tired and was thrown twenty metres out of his car. He had compression fractures on his fifth, sixth and seventh thoracic vertebrae and spent eleven months in a hospital in Bietigheim then was moved to five different hospitals in a span of five years. When he arrived at the Vienna General Hospital, he had a decubitus on his buttocks and was transferred to a rehabilitation centre in Tübingen. In 1972, his left leg got amputated followed by his right kidney, bladder, rectum and his right leg in 1985.

In the early 1990s, Kramminger discovered table tennis and began to compete internationally in 1995 where he won his first ever title when he won the European championships in Hillerod with Peter Starl and Manfred Dollmann.

References

1948 births
Living people
People from Wels
Paralympic table tennis players of Austria
Table tennis players at the 2000 Summer Paralympics
Table tennis players at the 2004 Summer Paralympics
Table tennis players at the 2008 Summer Paralympics
Table tennis players at the 2012 Summer Paralympics
Table tennis players at the 2016 Summer Paralympics
Sportspeople from Upper Austria
Austrian male table tennis players